Ricardo Ramos may refer to:

 Ricardo Ramos (footballer) (born 1980), Brazilian footballer
 Ricardo Ramos (athlete) (born 1985), Mexican long-distance runner
 Ricardo Ramos (fighter) (born 1995), Brazilian mixed martial artist